Fryeburg can refer to:

 Fryeburg, Louisiana, an unincorporated community, United States
 Fryeburg, Maine, a town, United States
 Fryeburg (CDP), Maine, a census-designated place, United States

See also
Fryburg (disambiguation)
 Freyburg (disambiguation)